Sirte is a city in Libya

Sirte may also refer to:

Military
 First Battle of Sirte (17 December 1941), World War II
 Second Battle of Sirte (22 March 1942), World War II
 Battle of Sirte (2011), Libyan Civil War

Other uses
 Sirte Basin, an oilfield beneath Sirte province and the Gulf
 Sirte Declaration, a 1999 resolution to create the African Union
 Sirte Oil Company, a Libyan oil company
 Gulf of Sirte, on Libya's coast

See also
 SIRT (disambiguation)
 Syrtis (disambiguation)